The Provisional Military Dictatorship of Mughan was a British-controlled anti-communist short-lived state founded in the Lankaran region on 1 August 1918. The Mughan government did not support independence of Azerbaijan and it was led by white Russian colonel T. P. Sukhorukov who acted under the protection of the British occupation of Baku. Mughan declared to be an autonomous part of "single and indivisible Russia." In December 1918, it was reorganized as Mughan Territorial Administration. On 25 April 1919 a violent protest organized by Talysh workers of pro-Bolshevik orientation exploded in Lankaran and deposed the Mughan Territorial Administration. On 15 May the Extraordinary Congress of the "Councils of Workers' and Peasants' Deputies" of Lankaran district proclaimed the Mughan Soviet Republic.

References

Former countries in Western Asia
Military history of Azerbaijan
1918 in Azerbaijan
1919 in Azerbaijan
World War I
Russian Civil War
1918 in Russia
States and territories disestablished in 1919
Mughan
States and territories established in 1918
1919 in Russia
Lankaran District
History of Talysh
Post–Russian Empire states
White movement
Provisional governments